Baltazar del Carmen Astorga Quezada (born 16 June 1982) is a Chilean former footballer.

Honours

Club
Deportes Antofagasta
 Primera B (1): 2011 Apertura

External links
 Astorga at Football-Lineups
 

1982 births
Living people
Chilean footballers
Chilean Primera División players
Primera B de Chile players
Cobresal footballers
Universidad de Chile footballers
C.D. Antofagasta footballers
O'Higgins F.C. footballers
Deportes Copiapó footballers
Association football defenders
People from Curicó